Chulluncani (possibly from Aymara chullunkhä ('ä' stands for a long 'a') icicle) is a mountain in the Andes of Bolivia, about  high. It is located in the Potosí Department, Nor Lípez Province, Colcha "K" Municipality, Soniquera Canton. Chulluncani lies at the northwestern shore of Pastos Grandes Lake.

See also 
 Ch'iyar Quta

References 

Mountains of Potosí Department